Baba Sampana (born 14 December 1991 in Ghana) is a Ghanaian football player currently playing for the Philippines Football League side Ilocos United F.C. in the Philippines.

Career
He joined in January 2008 from Shelter Force to Real Sportive, who played 1 year he left then Real Sportive with a move to Eleven Wise in 2009 and in August 2009 signed for Accra Hearts of Oak SC.

International
He was member for Ghana national under-17 football team in 2007 FIFA U-17 World Cup in Korea Republic. On 19 August 2008 was first called for the Satellites.

Honours

Club
Loyola
UFL Cup: 2013

Individual
UFL Cup Golden Gloves: 2013

References

1991 births
Living people
Ghanaian footballers
Accra Hearts of Oak S.C. players
Sekondi Wise Fighters players
Real Sportive players
Expatriate footballers in the Philippines
Ilocos United F.C. players
F.C. Meralco Manila players
Association football goalkeepers